New York City Guitar School is a teaching and performance institution with locations in Manhattan, Queens, Brooklyn, and Westchester County. Founded in 2004, by guitarist and teacher Dan Emery, the school began as a single room in the Recording and Rehearsal Arts Building, on West 30th Street, in Manhattan's Chelsea district. The school's five studios currently serve a population of over 2500 students, offering students of multiple skill levels private lessons and small group classes. Additionally, New York City Guitar School offers tutelage in other instruments, Suzuki method courses for young children, and band programs for kids, teens, and adults. Jen Elliott, who was involved with the school from its 2004 inception, became a co-owner of the company in 2012. She and Dan Emery act as the school's co-directors and program coordinators.

Programs

The school offers private studio and home lessons, as well as studio group classes, for guitar, bass guitar, voice, ukulele, banjo, drums, and keyboard. It also offers ten week group classes. Additionally, advanced elective courses are offered, covering techniques for playing leads, blues, funk, metal, classic rock, Brazilian guitar, and fingerpicking technique. Instruction is also given in studio recording basics, songwriting, and ear training. The school currently offers an online component for all of its “Beginners” curriculum.

Additional programs include a rock band program that brings together aspiring musicians to learn the ins-and-outs of rehearsing with a live band. The program is divided into “kids,” “teens,” and adult sections—with all of the courses culminating in a live showcase. Founder Dan Emery cites the popular video game Guitar Hero as a boon to encouraging children and teens to begin playing instruments. The school's youth guitar programs have frequently been listed on local NYC sites, as alternatives to traditional summer camps

New York City Guitar School has participated in several citywide, public music events. Most notably, they have organized performances during the 2011 and 2012 Make Music New York Festival and co-hosted the Mass Appeal: Guitars event with Guitar World, in 2013, and Acoustic Nation, in 2014.

The school's motto is to “To foster personal greatness through the medium of guitar lessons”. This sentiment is reflected in the teaching style and overall philosophy of the institution, which unifies commitment, deliberate practice, goal-setting, and personal growth with the enjoyment of learning to play an instrument.

Teachers

Over forty instructors are employed at the school's five branches and include notable New York City performers. All of the teachers hold music degrees and are rigorously vetted, as well as being active contributors to the local or national music scenes. The teachers represent colleges and universities such as Berklee College of Music, Yale University, the Manhattan School of Music, and the Duke Ellington School of the Arts. Several have shared the stage with artists such as Chaka Khan, The Drifters, Melissa Etheridge, Blues Traveler, John P. Hammond, The Allman Brothers, Béla Fleck, John Scofield, and been featured in the pit orchestra of Broadway productions of Mamma Mia and Jersey Boys. Notably, four instructors have received certification from the Suzuki Association of the Americas.

Dan Emery has extensive performing experience as a guitarist and songwriter for The Dan Emery Mystery Band. He co-founded Yonkers Boost Afterschool, a program that helps give students from underfunded schools access to the arts, cultural studies, and physical activity. Director Jen Elliott began her career as a singer and songwriter before pursuing her passion for guitar. She has released two albums on the indie label City Canyon Records and continues to write and perform.

Publications

Founder Dan Emery, who also holds a Masters of Education from Columbia University, wrote and self-published Guitar for Absolute Beginners, in 2009. This book serves as the foundational course for new guitar players pursuing group classes at the school. It presupposes that the student has little to no knowledge of playing guitar and covers material ranging from naming strings, strumming techniques, chord and tab diagrams, chord progressions, and practice sessions that culminate in the ability to play several arrangements of popular songs.

Other publications originating from New York City Guitar School include Guitar for Near Beginners, Guitar for Intermediate Beginners,The Ultimate Guitar Workbook, and Finger Style Basics for Guitar (written by instructor Lenny Molotov).

In November, 2014, Dan Emery was interviewed by Julia Pimsleur for a Forbes.com article on entrepreneurship and self-publishing. He expressed enthusiasm for self-publishing and discussed the success of Guitar for Absolute Beginners, which is available through the school and online retailers, and is even being used by guitar instructors otherwise unaffiliated with New York City Guitar School  .

References

External links

Entry in the Guitar lessons directory

Music schools in New York City
Guitars
2004 establishments in New York City
Educational institutions established in 2004